Gush Boran (also Romanized as Gūsh Borān and Gūshborān) is a village in Qarah Su Rural District, in the Central District of Kermanshah County, Kermanshah Province, Iran. At the 2006 census, its population was 180, in 37 families.

References 

Populated places in Kermanshah County